The Victory Ceremonies of the 2010 Winter Olympics were held between February 13 and 27, 2010 at BC Place Stadium in Vancouver, British Columbia, Canada and the Whistler Medals Plaza in Whistler, British Columbia, Canada. They were broadcast live starting at 6:30 PM (PST) from BC Place. The ceremonies featured both Canadian and international artists, including Hedley, Nelly Furtado, OneRepublic, Usher, Estelle and The All-American Rejects. Each evening began with a provincial/territorial celebration, followed by the awarding of the medals, in which each athlete stepped up to the podium to receive their medal. The evening ended with a concert finale honouring the medalists.

BC Place Stadium 
These artists performed at BC Place at night during the broadcast of the Victory Ceremonies.

Whistler Medal Plaza 
These artists performed at Whistler Medal Plaza at night during the broadcast of the Victory Ceremonies.

See also
 Sochi Medals Plaza, 2014 Winter Olympics

References

Ceremonies Victory